The Chef Menteur Bridge (also known as the Chef Menteur Pass Bridge) is a bridge which connects between New Orleans and Slidell, Louisiana. It carries U.S. Route 90 (US 90) across Chef Menteur Pass on the eastern side of Lake Pontchartrain.

See also

References

Bridges in New Orleans
Swing bridges in the United States
Bridges completed in 1929
Road bridges in Louisiana
U.S. Route 90
Bridges of the United States Numbered Highway System
1929 establishments in Louisiana